Dehl Berti (January 17, 1921 – November 26, 1991) was a Chiricahua Apache actor who often appeared in Westerns. One of his more recognized roles was as John Taylor on the 1988–1991 CBS western television series, Paradise, starring Lee Horsley as the reformed gunfighter Ethan Allen Cord.

A native of Pueblo, Colorado, of Apache descent. He married Francis Cummins Collins in 1944.

Berti appeared in guest-starring roles on many television programs from the 1950s through the 1980s, primarily in westerns such as Bonanza, Bat Masterson and Gunsmoke, but in other roles as well. In 1960 Berti appeared as Joe Maybe on Cheyenne in the episode titled "The Long Rope."  In 1963, he played the Indian, Little Buffalo, in the episode "The Day of the Flying Dutchman" on ABC's western series, The Travels of Jaimie McPheeters, starring child actor Kurt Russell. In 1982 he costarred as One Feather on the short-lived NBC drama series Born to the Wind.

Berti's final appearance was on a 1990 episode of the sitcom, Saved by the Bell. Since 1982, Berti can be heard as the voice of Chief Joseph of the Nez Perce in The American Adventure at Walt Disney World's Epcot Center in Florida.

Berti died of a heart attack in Los Angeles, California, on November 26, 1991, at the age of 70. He is interred there at Oakwood Memorial Park Cemetery.

Work
His films include: Laguna Heat (1987); Bullies (1986); Invasion USA (1985); Second Thoughts (1983); Wolfen (1981); The Last of the Mohicans (1977); Scott Free (1976); The Shaman's Last Raid, Sweet Hostage, and Seven Alone (1975); Ritual of Evil (1969); Under Fire, Undersea Girl, Apache Warrior, and Hell Bound (1957); and The Toughest Man Alive (1955). He also appeared in an episode of Universal's 1980's CBS-TV series Simon and Simon entitled "Ancient Echoes" (1987).

Partial filmography

Jump Into Hell (1955) – Lt. Tiercelin (uncredited)
 Toughest Man Alive (1955) – Salvador
The Ten Commandments (1956) – Pharaoh's Manservant / Architect's Assistant (uncredited)
Apache Warrior (1957) – Chikisin
Undersea Girl (1957) – Joe, Gang Member
Under Fire (1957) – Col. Jason (uncredited)
Hell Bound (1957) – Daddy
Seven Alone (1974) – White Elk
Sweet Hostage (1975) – Harry Fox
Scott Free (1976) – George Running Bear
The Last of the Mohicans (1977)
Wolfen (1981) – Old Indian
The American Adventure (1982) – Chief Joseph (voice)
Second Thoughts (1983) – Indian
Invasion USA (1985) – John Eagle
Bullies (1986) – Will Crow
Laguna Heat (1987) – Azul Mercante

References

External links

1921 births
1991 deaths
American male television actors
American male film actors
Male actors from Colorado
Native American male actors
American people of Apache descent
People from Pueblo, Colorado
Male actors from Los Angeles
Burials at Oakwood Memorial Park Cemetery
20th-century American male actors
Chiricahua